The Rajan case refers to the death of P. Rajan, a student of the Regional Engineering College, Calicut, as a result of torture in local police custody in Kerala during the nationwide Emergency in India in 1976, and the legal battle that followed, which revealed facts of the incident to the public. His remains are yet to be recovered.

Background 
During the nationwide Emergency in India between 1975 and 1977, Fundamental Rights of the citizen were suspended by the government, creating a period of police activism. In Kerala, the Naxal movement was at its peak during this period. Major operations of Naxals in Kerala were attacks on police stations in rural areas. The police acted with vengeance upon the Naxalites and used the word Naxal to address those upon whom they had vengeance.

Incident 
Rajan, a student of the Calicut Regional Engineering College (presently the National Institute of Technology Calicut), was arrested by the Kerala Police on 1 March 1976, during the nationwide Emergency in India along with his fellow student, Joseph Chaaly. As was later revealed by a petition in the High Court of Kerala, he was held in police custody and tortured as part of the interrogation. He died from torture of extreme kind, especially due to something called uruttal (a practice of "rolling" a heavy wooden log over the body of the victim). His body was then disposed of by the police, and was never recovered.

Rajan's father, T. V. Eachara Warrier, complained to the authorities about his missing son. The police finally confirmed that he died in custody upon a habeas corpus suit, the first such suit in the history of Kerala, filed by his father in the High Court of Kerala.

Inquiries by family

Rajan's mother had become mentally unstable from the developments and was hospitalised. His father, T. V. Eachara Warrier, lost all of his money but he did not know why his son was arrested, that he made enquiries to police officers, who, he felt, would be able to give him the details about his son's arrest and also about his whereabouts. He made representations to the authorities, which produced no result. Somehow, he discovered that Rajan had been arrested under directions of the DIG of Police, Crime Branch, Trivandrum. He met the then Home Minister of the State K. Karunakaran. He sent petitions to the Home Secretary to the government of Kerala thrice. There was not even a single reply or acknowledgment.

Mr. Warrier continued his efforts at getting some information about his son by similar representations made to the President of India and Home Minister to the government of India with copies to all the Members of Parliament from Kerala. He made similar representations to the Prime Minister of India and others, all to no effect. He met several police officers and learned that some arrested students similarly were detainees in the Central Jail. He was vigorously searching in vain for his son in the three Central Jails and also in the various other police camps and other places. He met the Chief Minister several times because the Chief Minister had personal knowledge of the arrest of his son and also of his detention. On the last occasion he met Sri. Achutha Menon, who expressed his helplessness in the matter and said that the matter was being dealt with by K. Karunakaran, Minister for Home Affairs.

He appealed to the general public in Kerala by expressing his grievance in a pamphlet distributed to the public. The Home Minister who was a candidate in the recent elections addressed several public meetings in Mala, Kalpetta and other constituencies of the State and in some of the meetings he made mention of the fact that Rajan was involved as an accused in a murder case and that was why he was detained. Rajan was never produced before a Magistrate.

Findings 
Rajan's father fought a long battle against the establishment to bring to light the facts behind the disappearance and expose atrocities committed by the state. The petition and subsequent investigations found that Rajan had indeed been taken into custody, and perhaps died when in police custody. His body was not found, and many charges against the accused in this case had to be dropped. The accused included the chief of the Crime Branch wing of Kerala Police, DIG Jayaram Padikkal, who was convicted but the conviction was overturned on appeal. Karunakaran was the Home Minister during the emergency. He resigned from the post of the Chief Minister of Kerala in 1978 from adverse judgement in the case. Warrier wrote the book, Memories of a Father, narrating his fights.

In popular culture 

The 2018 Malayalam movie Kaattu Vithachavar directed by Satheesh Paul presents investigation by a police team to disappearance of Rajan. The movie acted by Prakash Bare, Tini Tom Jayaprakash Kuloor provides a factual review of events, though the names of characters have been slightly changed.

The 1988 Malayalam film Piravi directed by Shaji N. Karun has its plotline adopted from this incident. The 2013 Malayalam film Idukki Gold references the case. Raman, one of the protagonists, throws ink at the Kerala Home Minister in protest against the Rajan case not being resolved. Malayalam movie Sahapaadi (1975), also touches the issue.
 

In 1977, the All Kerala Rajan Memorial Music Competition was started at the National Institute of Technology Calicut (then known as REC Calicut) to commemorate Rajan's life. Every year since 1987, the Institute conducts their annual cultural festival Ragam in memory of Rajan. In 2006, Ragam festival started with an audio message delivered by Rajan's father Eachara Warrier.

C. R. Omanakuttan has written a book named Shavamtheenikal which is an expose of the brutality involved in the incident.

In 2006 an experimental theatre work Ormakal Zindabad. (Memories long live) staged in certain places in Kerala, directed by G. Ajayan based on the custodial death of Rajan. The parts of leading characters Jayaram Padikkal and Rajan were done by Salih Rawther and Shabu Madhavan respectively.
The 2021 Tamil movie Jai Bhim, directly references the Rajan case as an example of a habeas corpus wherein the rare occurrence of a cross examination in a high court as grounds for not producing a detainee by the state police is permitted.

See also 
 Naxal Varghese

References

External links 
Articles T. P. Gopinath Pinarayi ambushed by Rajan case – Karunakaran is also victim!
Ebook on Rajan by his father
Revised link of the "Ebook on Rajan by his father"
PDF-Ebook(English)

1970s missing person cases
1976 murders in India
1976 in India
Crime in Kerala
Deaths in police custody in India
Enforced disappearances in India
History of Kerala (1947–present)
Male murder victims
Missing person cases in India
People murdered in Kerala
Political history of Kerala
The Emergency (India)